LTT 9779 is a G-type main-sequence star located  away from the Solar System in the constellation of Sculptor. The star is about 95% the radius and about the same mass as the Sun. LTT 9779 is orbited by one known exoplanet.

Planetary system 

The discovery of the exoplanet LTT 9779 b using TESS was published in 2020. It is an ultra-hot Neptune with about 29 times the mass and 4.7 times the radius of Earth and an orbital period of less than a day. These parameters make it one of the very few known planets in the Neptunian desert. A study published in 2019, prior to the confirmation of planet b, proposed a second candidate planet in the system based on transit timing variations, but this has not been confirmed.

In August 2022, this planetary system was included among 20 systems to be named by the third NameExoWorlds project.

References 

Sculptor (constellation)
G-type main-sequence stars
Planetary systems with one confirmed planet
CD-38 15670
117883
0193